The Nesmith Cougar is a light aircraft that was developed in the United States in the 1950s and marketed for homebuilding.

Development
The design, by Robert Nesmith, is a conventional high-wing, strut-braced monoplane with fixed tailwheel undercarriage. The pilot and a single passenger were seated side by side. The fuselage and empennage were of welded steel-tube construction, while the wings were of wood, and the whole aircraft was fabric-covered. Some later aircraft were fitted with a tricycle undercarriage.

The original Cougar design was marketed by Nesmith himself. His intent was to market a low-cost aircraft for homebuilders. He also used the aircraft as a troubled youth project to encourage teens to work together toward a goal. When a modified Cougar won an Experimental Aircraft Association (EAA) design competition in 1963, that organization took over selling plans. Rights to the design were eventually purchased by Acro Sport.

The aircraft shape was influenced by the Beechcraft Staggerwing and Wittman Tailwind. The name came from the college of Nesmith's daughter, the University of Houston, whose athletic mascot is a cougar.

Variants
Nesmith M1 Cougar
The original design for home building. Powered by 108hp Lycoming.
Nesmith Cougar Comet
Cougar modified with a 125hp Lycoming O-290D.
Nesmith Chigger & Landoll's Skydoll
One example was built with folding wings and Culver Cadet landing gear, called the "Chigger". Another example built with folding wings with automatic control latching. Both aircraft are capable of being towed backwards behind a car.

Specifications (typical)

See also

References

 

1950s United States sport aircraft
Homebuilt aircraft
Single-engined tractor aircraft
High-wing aircraft
Acro Sport aircraft
Aircraft first flown in 1957